The list of shipwrecks in May 1835 includes ships sunk, foundered, wrecked, grounded or otherwise lost during May 1835.

1 May

2 May

3 May

6 May

9 May

10 May

11 May

13 May

15 May

16 May

17 May

19 May

20 May

21 May

23 May

24 May

27 May

28 May

30 May

Unknown date

References

1835-05